1901 is a year in the 20th century.

1901 may also refer to:

 1901 BC, a year in the 20th century BC
 1901 (number), a number
 1901 (song), a song by Phoenix
 1901 (novel), a novel by Robert Conroy